The Abominables is a children's novel by Eva Ibbotson, published after her death, in 2012. According to WorldCat, the book is in 1,031 libraries as of November 2015.

Ibbotson probably wrote the novel in the 1994, and did not wish for it to be published as it was not the kind of ghost story she usually wrote. Her family decided to go through with the publication after her death, and the book was edited for publication by her son Toby together with Ibbotson's editor.

Plot
Lady Agatha, the daughter of an aristocratic explorer is kidnapped by yetis in 1912. She realises they are gentle, teaches them to speak, and cares for them. A hundred years pass, and Lady Agatha is still alive.

Reception
A reviewer in The Guardian calls the book "a hugely enjoyable and witty rollick", but remarks that Ibbotson's grief for her husband plays a part in the novel's backstory. The Abominables also received favourable reviews in Kirkus Reviews and The Telegraph, where the reviewer called it "another gem" by Ibbotson.

References

2012 British novels
Yeti in fiction
Novels set in fictional countries